The Darlington Lecture is a lectureship of the John Innes Centre named after its former director, the geneticist C. D. Darlington.

Lecturers
Source: John Innes Centre
 2001 Alec Jeffreys
 2002 Kim Nasmyth
 2004 Nicholas R. Cozzarelli
 2005 Frank Grosveld
 2007 Susan R. Wessler, University of Georgia, USA - 'It's alive: activation of virtual rice transposable elements in Arabidopsis and yeast'
 2008 Ewan Birney, EMBL, Hinxton, Cambridge, UK - 'Ensembl and ENCODE; understanding genomes'
 2010 Edward Rubin, Lawrence Berkeley National Laboratory
 2012 David Baulcombe, Department of Plant Sciences, University of Cambridge, UK – ‘RNA silencing and genome defense of plants’
 2013 Chad Nusbaum, Broad Institute of MIT and Harvard, USA- ‘DNA technology as the engine of scientific discovery’
 2015 Detlef Weigel, Molecular Biology of Plants & Animals, MPI for Developmental Biology –  ‘Origin and consequences of genetic and epigenetic variation in Arabidopsis thaliana and its relatives’

See also

 List of genetics awards

References

Genetics awards
Genetics in the United Kingdom
Science and technology in Norfolk
Science lecture series